Yulia Zagoruychenko (born September 11, 1981) is a ten-times undefeated Latin Dance Champion and the current World Latin Dance Champion with her partner/husband, Riccardo Cocchi.

Originally from Russia, she began Russian Folklore ensemble dancing at the age of four. As a child, she enjoyed watching and copying dancers on TV, so her mother agreed to take her to dance classes, where she did folk dancing for three years. She then moved into ballroom dancing. At the age of 11, Zagoruychenko started to teach kids to earn some money which she then gave to her parents. At age 12, she earned her first major title in Russia when she became the Russian Junior National Champion. For financial reasons, she was not able to afford to dance both Ballroom and Latin and hence, at the age of 16, she chose to pursue Latin. At the age of 21, she decided to move to America and partnered with Maxim Kozhevnikov. Together they became the US National Professional Champions. In the fall of 2007, she began dancing with Riccardo Cocchi.

Zagoruychenko and Cocchi won their first World Latin Dance Championship in 2010 and earned their eighth title in 2017. They are ranked as #1 in the world of Professional Latin. They recently won their 5th consecutive US National Professional Latin Champions title at the US Open Dance Competition. In October 2019, they announced their retirement, with their last international competition being the World Professional Latin Champions in Miami.

Yulia takes inspiration from other forms of dance besides Latin, as well as from other musicians. Some of her inspirations are dancers Cyd Charisse, Fred Astaire, Diana Vishneva, Gaynor Fairweather, and Donnie Burns. She is also inspired by musicians Jose Feliciano, Tina Turner, Andrea Bocelli, Christina Aguilera, and the dance companies Pilobolus and Alvin Ailey.

Titles 
2010-2019: World Professional Latin Champions
2009: World Professional Showdance Champions
2008-2016 and 2018: U.S. National Professional Latin Champions
2012, 2015-2017: Winners of the International Championships England
2008-2014: U.S. Open Champions
2016-2018: Blackpool Dance Festival Champions, England
2016-2017: Blackpool Dance Festival Champions, China
2016-2018: UK Championship Champions, England
2008-2011, 2013-2017: WDC Fred Astaire Cup Competition (Disneyland, Paris)
2008-2017: Dutch Open Champions, Assen
2010-2018: Asian Open Champions (Tokyo, Japan)
2013, 2016: Asian Open Champions (Korea and China)
2010-2014, 2016-2018: Asian Open Champions (Taiwan)
2010-2012: Asian Open Champions (Indonesia)
2010-2014, 2015-2017: Asian Open Champions (Macao)
2010-2012: Philippine Star Ball Champions
2009, 2012, 2013: German Open Champions
2012, 2016: Asian Pacific Champions

References

External links
Official website

1981 births
Living people
People from Belgorod
Russian ballroom dancers
Russian female dancers
21st-century Russian dancers